Quenton may refer to:

Quenton Ashlyn (1858–1933), the pseudonym of society entertainer Frank Kennedy
Quenton Cassidy (John L. Parker Jr.) (born 1947), American writer, author of Once A Runner'
Quenton DeCosey (born 1994), American professional basketball player
Antwone Quenton Fisher (born 1959), American director, screenwriter, author, film producer
Quenton Leach (1972–2020), Australian rules footballer
Quenton Meeks (born 1997), American football cornerback
Quenton Nelson (born 1996), American football guard

See also
Cyclone Quenton (1983) in the 1983–84 Australian region cyclone season
Cyclone Quenton (1993) in the 1993–94 Australian region cyclone season
Quentin
Quintain (disambiguation)
Quinten (disambiguation)
Quinton